Elements is the debut extended play by South African singer and songwriter Elaine. It was self-released on September 29, 2019.

Elements was nominated for Best R&B/Soul Album at the 2020 South African Music Awards.

Track listing

Personnel 
All credits adapted from discogs.

 Clxrity - producer 
 Elizée - producer 
 Elaine - writer, vocals, executive producer

Certifications and sales

References 

2019 debut EPs
Self-released EPs